Jarien Moreland (born December 26, 1988) is a former American football offensive lineman. He played college football at Southern Illinois University Carbondale and attended Glades Central High School in Belle Glade, Florida. He was a member of the Spokane Shock, Tampa Bay Storm, Spokane Empire, Portland Steel, Sioux Falls Storm, and Washington Valor.

College career
Moreland played for the UCF Knights in 2008, Florida A&M from 2010 to 2012 Southern Illinois Salukis in 2013. He was the team's starter his final season and helped the Salukis to 7 wins. He played in 27 games during his career including 20 starts at guard.

Professional career

Spokane Shock
On March 6, 2015, Moreland was assigned to the Spokane Shock of the Arena Football League. On April 2, 2015, he was placed on recallable reassignment. Moreland appeared in one game for the Shock.

Tampa Bay Storm
On April 3, 2015, Moreland was traded to the Tampa Bay Storm for claim order position. On April 7, 2015, he was placed on refused to report by the Storm. On July 9, 2015, Moreland was placed on reassignment.

Spokane Empire
On November 30, 2015, Moreland signed with the Spokane Empire of the Indoor Football League.

Portland Steel
On February 3, 2016, Moreland was assigned to the Portland Thunder. On May 23, 2016, Moreland was placed on injured reserve.

Sioux Falls Storm
Moreland signed with the Sioux Falls Storm of the Indoor Football League on November 15, 2016. On January 21, 2017, Moreland was placed on the refused to report list.

Washington Valor
Moreland was assigned to the Washington Valor on February 1, 2017. On May 25, 2017, Moreland was placed on injured reserve.

References

External links
Southern Illinois Salukis profile

Living people
1988 births
Players of American football from Florida
American football offensive linemen
UCF Knights football players
Florida A&M Rattlers football players
Southern Illinois Salukis football players
Spokane Shock players
Tampa Bay Storm players
Spokane Empire players
Portland Steel players
Sioux Falls Storm players
Washington Valor players
People from Belle Glade, Florida